The  is a Japanese government agency and an integrated financial regulator responsible for overseeing banking, securities and exchange, and insurance sectors in order to ensure the stability of the financial system of Japan. The agency operates with a Commissioner and reports to the Minister of State for Financial Services. It oversees the Securities and Exchange Surveillance Commission and the Certified Public Accountants and Auditing Oversight Board. Its main office is located in Tokyo.

History 
The FSA was established on July 1, 2000 by the merger of the Financial Supervisory Agency with the Financial System Planning Bureau, a bureau of the Ministry of Finance. The Financial Supervisory Agency had been established in 1998, amid severe instability in the Japanese financial system, to conduct concentrated inspections of Japanese financial institutions in coordination with the Bank of Japan. The FSA was under the supervision of the Financial Reconstruction Commission (FRC) until January 2001, when the FRC was abolished and the FSA became directly subordinate to the Cabinet Office through a State Minister.

Organization 
The FSA consists of the following organizations:

 Strategy Development and Management Bureau
 Policy and Markets Bureau
 Supervision Bureau
 Securities and Exchange Surveillance Commission
 Certified Public Accountants and Auditing Oversight Board

A portion of the FSA's inspection and supervision authority with regard to local financial institutions is delegated to Local Finance Bureaus and Local Finance Offices throughout Japan. These are organs of the Ministry of Finance but are directed and supervised by the FSA Commissioner in this capacity.

Cabinet Ministers

See also
Financial Services Authority
Securities Commission

References

External links 
  
  

2000 establishments in Japan
Government agencies established in 2000
Cabinet Office (Japan)
Japan
Government agencies of Japan